Mattar M'Boge (born 21 June 1980) is a football coach and former player who is the current head coach of the Gambia national under-20 football team. He was promoted from his previous role as Head Coach of the U-17 national team to Head Coach of the Gambia national under-20 football team in October 2017. He is also the former head coach for Real de Banjul FC.

Early life

M'Boge moved with his family to Saudi Arabia at the age of 4.

Coaching career

Gambia U-20 
As head coach of the Gambia national under-20 football team he secured the 2018 WAFU/FOX U-20 Tournament title in his first international assignment. The tournament was hosted by Liberia and the Young Scorpions were the only unbeaten team in the tournament. This was the first ever trophy at U-20 level for the country and he became the first Gambian head coach to win an international trophy and also became the youngest coach (aged 37) to achieve this accolade so far. 

Following their triumph, the team was received by the President of The Gambia, Adama Barrow, who congratulated them and expressed his pride for their achievements. 

He led the team to third place in the 2019 WAFU U-20 Tournament held in Conakry, Guinea.

M'Boge won a second WAFU A Championship at the 2021 Africa U-20 Cup of Nations qualification as the team earned the sole zonal qualifying spot for the 2021 Africa U-20 Cup of Nations for the third time in the country's history and ten years after their previous qualification to the 2011 African U-20 Championship. He was also awarded 'Best Coach' at the end of tournament awards after stunning hosts Senegal in the final by winning 4-3 on penalties following a 2-2 draw after extra time.

He guided the team to the semi-finals at the 2021 Africa U-20 Cup of Nations where they lost to eventual winners Ghana, before securing the bronze medal in the play-off match after beating Tunisia 4-2 on penalties following a 0-0 draw after extra-time.

Honours
Real de Banjul
GFA League First Division: 2014

Gambia U-20
WAFU U-20 Championship : 2018
WAFU U-20 Championship third place : 2019
WAFU U-20 Championship : 2021
Africa U-20 Cup of Nations third place : 2021 
Qualification for the 2021 FIFA U-20 World Cup

Individual
WAFU 'A' U-20 Championship 'Best Coach': 2020  
Gambia Football Coaches' Association Achievement Award: 2021
Sports Journalists' Association of The Gambia Award: 2021

See also 

 Gambia national under-17 football team
 Gambia national under-20 football team

References

1980 births
Living people
Gambian football managers